Tongyong Pinyin was the official romanization of Mandarin in Taiwan between 2002 and 2008. The system was unofficially used between 2000 and 2002, when a new romanization system for Taiwan was being evaluated for adoption. Taiwan's Ministry of Education approved the system in 2002, but its use was optional.

Since 1 January 2009, the Ministry of Education has officially promoted Hanyu Pinyin (per decision on 16 September 2008); local governments would "not be able to get financial aid from the central government" if they used Tongyong Pinyin-derived romanizations. After this policy change, Tongyong Pinyin has been used for the transliteration of some place names and personal names in Taiwan (Republic of China). Some of the romanized names of the districts, subway stations and streets in Kaohsiung, Tainan, Taichung, Yunlin County and other places are derived from Tongyong Pinyin for example, Cijin District (Cíjin Cyu).

History

The impetus behind the invention of Tongyong Pinyin came from the need for a standardized romanization system in Taiwan. For decades, the island had employed various systems, usually simplifications or adaptations of Wade–Giles. (Zhuyin, a standard phonetic system for language education in Taiwan's schools, does not use the Latin alphabet.)

Yu's system was subsequently revised.

Discussion and adoption of Tongyong Pinyin, like many other initiatives in Taiwan, quickly acquired a partisan tone turning on issues of national identity: Chinese vs. Taiwanese identity. Officials who identified most strongly with the nation itself, such as the Democratic Progressive Party (DPP) and its allied parties, saw no reason to adopt Hanyu Pinyin just because Mainland China and the UN had. If Tongyong Pinyin more adequately met the nation's needs, they saw this as ample justification for Taiwan to adopt it. Officials who identified more strongly with Chinese culture, such as the Kuomintang (KMT), saw no reason to introduce a new system unique to Taiwan if Hanyu Pinyin had already gained international acceptance. Each side accused the other of basing its preference on anti-China or pro-China sentiment rather than an objective discussion of community goals.

In early October 2000, the Mandarin Commission of the Ministry of Education proposed to use Tongyong Pinyin as the national standard. Education Minister Ovid Tzeng submitted a draft of the Taiwanese romanization in late October to the Executive Yuan, but the proposal was rejected. In November 2000, Tzeng unsuccessfully suggested that the government adopt Hanyu Pinyin with some modifications for local dialects. On 10 July 2002, Taiwan's Ministry of Education held a meeting for 27 members. Only 13 attended. Two left early, and since the chairman could not vote, the bill for using Tongyong Pinyin was passed with 10 votes.

In August 2002, the government adopted Tongyong Pinyin by an administrative order that local governments had the authority to override within their jurisdiction. In October 2007, with the DPP administration still in power, it was announced that Taiwan would standardize the English transliterations of its Chinese Mandarin place names by the end of the year, after years of confusion from multiple spellings, by using the locally developed Tongyong Pinyin.

In 2008, the Kuomintang won both the legislative and presidential elections. In September 2008, it was announced that Tongyong Pinyin would be replaced by Hanyu Pinyin as Taiwan's standard, at the end of the year. Since 1 January 2009, Hanyu Pinyin has been an official romanization system in Taiwan.

On 24 August 2020, the Taichung City Council decided to use Tongyong Pinyin in the translated names of the stations on the Green line (Taichung Metro).

Adoption and use

Tongyong Pinyin was the official romanization system in Taiwan, but its use was voluntary. The romanization system that one encounters in Taiwan varies according to the government authority that administers the facility. Street signs in most areas use Tongyong Pinyin, including the cities of Kaohsiung, Tainan, and surrounding counties. A contrast could be seen in the two entities that now make up the municipality of Taichung–Taichung County used Tongyong Pinyin while Taichung City has used Hanyu Pinyin since at least 2004. Then-mayor Ma Ying-jeou remained committed to using Hanyu Pinyin as the Romanization standard for Taipei. Taipei County (now New Taipei City) used Tongyong Pinyin, but in Taipei Metro stations, Tongyong Pinyin was given in parentheses after Hanyu Pinyin. Modified Wade–Giles spellings are popularly used for many proper names, especially personal names and businesses.

The political impasse prevented Ministry of Education from being able to replace Zhuyin in teaching pronunciation in elementary school. Zhuyin is widely used to teach Mandarin pronunciation to schoolchildren. Children's books published in Taiwan typically display Zhuyin characters next to Chinese characters in the text.

On 17 September 2008, the Ministry of Education announced that the government standard for romanization would be switched to Hanyu Pinyin nationwide, effective 1 January 2009. However, people in the Taiwan can freely choose their foreign language names. So although Tongyong Pinyin was effectively scrapped as the romanization standard of Taiwan's central government, many today choose a romanized form of their Chinese character name that is created based on the Tongyong Pinyin, Wade–Giles, or Yale romanization systems.

Today, districts of Kaohsiung are named by Tongyong. Districts of Tainan are mostly named by Tongyong with exceptions such as Xinying.

Taiwanese language variant
The Tongyong Pinyin system also exists in a Taiwanese Hokkien phonetic symbol version, Daighi tongiong pingim, which lacks f but adds bh. However, in 2006, the Ministry of Education rejected the use of Daighi tongiong pingim for Taiwanese Hokkien and preferred the Taiwanese Romanization System.

Features

Spelling
Some notable features of Tongyong Pinyin are:

 The first tone is unmarked.
 Hanyu Pinyin's zh- becomes jh- (Wade–Giles uses ch-).
 Hanyu Pinyin's x- and q- are not used in Tongyong Pinyin and become s- and c- (Wade–Giles uses hs- and ch'-).
 The Hanyu Pinyin -i (not represented in Zhuyin) known as the empty rhyme, are shown as -ih (somewhat like Wade–Giles): those in Hanyu Pinyin as zi, ci, si, zhi, chi, shi, and ri all end in -ih in Tongyong Pinyin.

 ü used in Hanyu Pinyin (written u after j, q and x) is replaced by yu.

 -eng becomes ong after f- and w-
 wen becomes wun
 -iong becomes yong: syong instead of pinyin xiong (cf. -iang remains unchanged: siang).
 Unlike in Wade–Giles and Hanyu Pinyin, -iu and -ui (liu [] and gui []), contractions can be written out in full as -iou and -uei. However, according to the Ministry of the Interior, in romanizations of names of places that is at township-level or below township-level, the letters must be written in full.

Punctuation
 Tongyong syllables in the same word (except placenames) are to be separated by hyphens, like Wade–Giles, but in the Ministry of the Interior's romanizations, placenames have no spaces between the syllables.
 Tongyong uses tone marks like Zhuyin, not like Hanyu Pinyin. Tongyong Pinyin has no mark for the first tone but a dot for the neutral tone (optional on computers).

Shared features with Hanyu Pinyin
If tone is ignored, 19.47% of Tongyong Pinyin syllables are spelled differently to those of Hanyu Pinyin. The difference widens when syllables are measured according to average frequency of use in everyday life to a 48.84% difference in spellings. In two cases (si and ci) the same Latin spelling denotes different syllables depending on the transcription system.

Arguments

The prevalence of Hanyu Pinyin as an established system weighs at least as heavily on the debate over Tongyong Pinyin as any feature of the system itself. Arguments presented in the ongoing debate include these.

Supporting Tongyong Pinyin

Intrinsic
 Tongyong spelling, it is argued, yields more accurate pronunciation from non-Chinese speakers than does Hanyu Pinyin. Tongyong does not use the letters q and x, for example, in ways that confuse non-Chinese speakers who lack training in the system. However, this argument is contradicted by internal inconsistencies in Tongyong Pinyin (for example, in the use of the letter "c" in Tongyong Pinyin to represent the sound , represented by "q" in Hanyu Pinyin).
 Those familiar with Hanyu Pinyin will encounter nothing radically different when using Tongyong Pinyin.
 Tongyong eliminates the need for diacritics for the ü sound.
 The spellings "fong" and "wong" are more accurate to reflect the sounds of 風 and 翁, as pronounced in the Standard Mandarin in Taiwan, as compared with "feng" and "weng".

Practical

 Tongyong Pinyin is business-friendly because of the ease it offers in pronunciation. Visitors to Taiwan can thus more easily describe and find place names, personal names, businesses and locales.
 Tongyong Pinyin requires no more special accommodation in international correspondence than the difference in Chinese characters (simplified vs. traditional) already requires.
 Tongyong strikes a balance between the need for internationalization and Taiwan's local needs.
 Tongyong Pinyin would not supplant Hanyu Pinyin in Taiwan, as Hanyu Pinyin is rarely encountered outside the Taipei area anyway and has never been in common use. Tongyong Pinyin is intended to supplant the many variants of Wade–Giles that remain the dominant form of romanization encountered in Taiwan. No one questions the superiority of Tongyong Pinyin to Wade–Giles and the benefit to be gained from the change.
 Tongyong does not force its exclusive use on those who have already studied Hanyu Pinyin. One can use any system to render characters while one types or formats documents in Mandarin. Computers and electronic devices in Taiwan already offer Hanyu Pinyin and MPS keyboards as options. Transitions between romanized forms are also easily achieved if needed.
 Romanization is most useful to individuals who lack training in Mandarin but encounter names and terms in press reports and literature. Students of Mandarin gain literacy in Chinese characters and drop romanization systems of any kind. It, therefore, makes sense that, if possible, one should enable a confident first-time pronunciation of Mandarin words by outsiders.

Against Tongyong Pinyin

Intrinsic
 Tongyong Pinyin treats c and s as having two allophones each:
 c is pronounced  before "i", and  otherwise.
 s is pronounced  before "i", and  otherwise.
 Internal inconsistencies exist within Tongyong Pinyin such as the use of different letters to represent the same sound: e vs. u (ben, pen, fen and men but wun) and i vs. y (ciang but cyong) because of the correspondence with the equivalent Zhuyin spellings or the use of the same letter to represent different sounds (s, c and z, each representing both a dental and a palatal sibilant).

Practical
 The standard romanization system of Mainland China, the International Organization for Standardization, and the United Nations is Hanyu Pinyin. 
  Tongyong Pinyin-derived transliteration spellings are created. For example, "Qing Dynasty" (via Hanyu Pinyin) and "Ch'ing Dynasty" (via Wade–Giles) is spelled as "Cing Dynasty" (via Tongyong Pinyin). "Zhou Dynasty" (via Hanyu Pinyin), or "Chou Dynasty" (via Wade–Giles), is spelled as "Jhou Dynasty" (via Tongyong Pinyin).

Comparison with other orthographies

The differences between Tongyong Pinyin and Hanyu Pinyin are relatively straightforward:
 The palatalized consonants are written j, c, s rather than j, q, x.
 The retroflex consonants are jh, ch, sh rather than zh, ch, sh.
 The "buzzing" vowels are written ih (shih, sih) rather than i (shi, si).
 Yu and yong are still spelled with a 'y' even after a consonant (nyu), rather than as ü, u, or iong.
 You and wei are written iou and uei after a consonant (diou, duei), rather than contracted to iu and ui.
 Eng is written labialized ong after the labial consonants f, w (fong, wong), but weng/wong contracts to ong after another consonant in both systems.
 Wen becomes wun.
 Neutral tone is written but not first tone.

Gallery

See also
 Hanyu Pinyin
 Daighi tongiong pingim (DT in Taiwanese)

References

External links

 Linguistic analysis
 Bopomofo-Hanyu Pinyin-Tongyong Pinyin comparison chart
 漢語拼音與通用拼音對照表 Hanyu Pinyin-Tongyng Pinyin comparison chart (Chinese)
 Formal documents  (in Traditional Chinese): from Academia Sinica
 Toponomastic Rules (in Traditional Chinese): from Wikisource
 Pinyin.info
 Chinese Phonetic Conversion Tool - Converts between Tongyong Pinyin, Hanyu Pinyin, Zhuyin and other formats

Mandarin words and phrases
Romanization of Chinese
Pinyin